Tiago Peixoto may refer to:

 Tiago C. Peixoto, Brazilian political scientist
 Tiago P. Peixoto, Brazilian physicist